Stone Forsythe (December 29, 1997) is an American football offensive tackle for the Seattle Seahawks of the National Football League (NFL). He played college football at Florida.

Early life and high school
Forsythe was born and grew up in Winter Garden, Florida, and attended West Orange High School. He committed to play college football at Florida over offers from Kentucky and Duke.

College career
Forsythe redshirted his true freshman season. He saw his first playing time when he started the final two games of his redshirt freshman season. Forsythe played in all 13 of Florida's games with one start as a redshirt sophomore. He became a starter going into his redshirt junior season and started the final 25 games of his career. Forsythe appeared in 40 games with 28 starts over the course of his collegiate career.

Professional career

Forsythe was drafted by the Seattle Seahawks in the sixth round, 208th overall, of the 2021 NFL Draft. On May 14, 2021, Forsythe signed his four-year rookie contract with Seattle worth over $3.6 million and a signing bonus of $166,000.

Personal life
Forsythe's father, Ray Forsythe, played college football at Kent State and UCF and professionally for the Cincinnati Bengals, the Amsterdam Admirals, and the Orlando Predators.

References

External links 
Florida Gators bio

Living people
American football offensive tackles
Players of American football from Florida
Sportspeople from Orange County, Florida
Florida Gators football players
People from Winter Garden, Florida
Seattle Seahawks players
1997 births